Youssef Chaib (born 12 August 1996) is a Norwegian professional footballer who plays for Sandefjord in the Eliteserien.

Club career
In January 2022, Chaib signed a two year contract with Eliteserien side Sandefjord.

References

External links
 

1996 births
Norwegian people of Algerian descent
Eliteserien players
Fredrikstad FK players
Living people
Strømmen IF players
Sandefjord Fotball players
Norwegian First Division players
Norwegian Second Division players
Norwegian footballers
Association football forwards
Kvik Halden FK players